The Yorkshire Rugby Football Union is the governing body responsible for rugby union in the historic county of Yorkshire, England. It is one of the constituent bodies of the national Rugby Football Union having formed in 1869, the union was formerly called Yorkshire County Club.

The county has won the county championship on 15 occasions, and finished as runners-up on a further eight occasions. The Yorkshire RFU also organises the Yorkshire Cup, which was inaugurated in 1878.

History

Early years of County representative team
The first match arranged for the county of Yorkshire took place in 1870, at Leeds against Lancashire. This match was immediately known as the "Battle of the Roses" and was considered the "blue ribbon" of Northern rugby football. To be selected to represent the county was an honour bestowed long before the foundation of the Yorkshire RFU and it was seen as "the high road to International honours".

Formation of the Yorkshire Football Union
Any form of sporting interest with appeal to a Yorkshireman promptly engenders demand for a match with Lancashire. Before Rugby football had even acquired commonly acceptable laws or pattern of play Yorkshire and Lancashire were eager to compete with each other and from this eagerness grew, in course of time and through disharmonious days, the Rugby Football Unions of Yorkshire and Lancashire.
A Yorkshireman, J. G. Hudson, was innovator; not of the Yorkshire Rugby Union, but of matches with Lancashire, which originated county Rugby, thereby demanding the creation of county authorities.
Hudson was a founder of the Leeds Athletic Club which was built on the simple basis of a newspaper invitation to play football on Woodhouse Moor "from 7 to 8 o'clock a.m.".
The Victorian virtue of early rising brought extension of playing hours; morning football came to start at 6.30 a.m.-presumably when daylight permitted-and either the power of the Press or the inherent fascination of the new pastime induced attendances of 500, participants in practice games numbering 60 to 150, all, apparently, served by one ball and goalposts consisting of broom handles identified by fluttering cotton.
These practices on Woodhouse Moor were not conducted entirely for their own sake. There were other Northern nurseries of the same, or a similar, game and in 1864 matches were played against Sheffield. Winds of challenge blew across the Pennines; in 1865 Leeds played Manchester.
This, of course, was not enough. Yorkshire had to meet Lancashire and at Hudson's instigation they did, so instituting county history in Rugby football.
The first Yorkshire authority and the first Yorkshire team were representative of the county only in their representation of Leeds, Bradford, Huddersfield and Hull and no formal committee was required because no formal business had to be transacted.
Match management was by venue, Leeds, Bradford, and Huddersfield finding the grounds and choosing the teams for home matches and Hull undertaking responsibility for away fixtures.
The Northern counties are prideful communities and Rugby football quickly extended county pride and loyalties. Yorkshire's founding fathers, spurred by Harry Wharfedale Tennant Garnett of Bradford, wanted county matches to become occasions offering hospitality off the field as well as a contest in sport and to this end preparation was necessary.
By 1874 the representatives of Leeds Athletic, Bradford, Huddersfield, Hull and York were meeting as a committee to promote county interests.
They were a self-created authority, serving a current need and they sought to be no more than the machinery of a county club as distinct from a union of represented clubs within a geographical and administrative area.
The committee of the five held county reins through a period of accumulating discontent as the Rugby game spread and the number of clubs increased. They were challenged in 1880 and, with no great show of enthusiasm, invited two other clubs to join them.
They bent further before the wind in 1883 when they proposed a revised constitution, but dismissed a request for county organisation under elected members from Yorkshire clubs within the now established national Rugby Union.
They conceded the inevitable in 1888 when the Yorkshire County Club formally became the Yorkshire Rugby Union.

County side
The county side has reached the County Championship Final 23 times, winning the title on 15 occasions.

Honours

From 1984 all Championship finals were played at Twickenham Stadium.

Games played against international opposition

Games played against international opposition by composite teams including Yorkshire

Notable players for the County side
See Yorkshire County RFU players

Notes;
★ RFU President

Club sides
Amongst the clubs falling within the Yorkshire Rugby Football Union are several clubs of national renown including; Doncaster R.F.C., Hull Ionians, Leeds Tykes, Rotherham R.U.F.C., Wakefield RFC (now non-playing), and Wharfedale R.U.F.C.

Rugby league clubs that were members of the Yorkshire RFU before switching codes during or shortly after the schism include Batley, Bradford, Halifax, Huddersfield, Hunslet, Hull FC, Hull Kingston Rovers, Keighley, Leeds, Wakefield Trinity and York.

Affiliated club sides

There are currently 94 clubs affiliated with the Yorkshire RFU, most of which have teams at both senior and junior level. These clubs are based in the districts that make up modern Yorkshire - East Riding of Yorkshire, North Yorkshire, South Yorkshire and West Yorkshire.

A
Acklam (website)
Adwick Le Street (website)
Aireborough (website)

B
Baildon (website)
Barnsley (website)
Beverley (website)
Bradford & Bingley (website)
Bradford Salem (website)
Bramley Phoenix (website)
Bridlington (website)
Burley (website)

C
Castleford (website)
Cleckheaton (website)

D
Dinnington (website)
Doncaster Knights (website)
Doncaster Phoenix (website)
Driffield (website)

G
Garforth (website)
Goole (website)

H
Halifax (website)
Halifax Vandals (website)
Harrogate (website)
Harrogate Pythons (website)
Heath (website)
Hemsworth (website)
Hessle (website)
Hornsea (website)
Huddersfield (website)
Huddersfield Y.M.C.A. (website)
Hull (website)
Hull Ionians (website)
Hullensians (website)

I
Ilkley (website)

K
Keighley (website)
Knaresborough (website)
Knottingley (website)

L
Leeds Corinthians (website)
Leeds Medics & Dentists (website)
Leeds Tykes
Leodiensians (website)

M
Malton & Norton (website)
Marist (website)
Middlesbrough (website)
Moortown (website)
Morley (website)
Mosborough (website)

N
Nestle Rowntree (website)
Northallerton (website)
North Ribblesdale (website)

O
Old Brodleians (website)
Old Crossleyans (website)
Old Grovians (website)
Old Modernians (website)
Old Otliensians (website)
Old Rishworthians (website)
Ossett (website)
Otley (website)

P
Pocklington (website)
Pontefract (website)

R
Rawmarsh (website)
Redcar (website)
Richmondshire (website)
Ripon (website)
Rodillians (website)
Rossington (website)
Rotherham Clifton (website)
Rotherham Phoenix (website)
Rotherham Titans (website)
Roundhegian (website)

S
Sandal (website)
Scarborough (website)
Selby (website)
Sheffield (website)
Sheffield Medicals (website)
Sheffield Oaks (website)
Sheffield Tigers (website)
Skipton (website)
Stocksbridge (website)

T
Thirsk (website)
Thornensians (website)

W
Wakefield 
Wath-upon-Dearne (website)
Wensleydale (website)
West Leeds (website)
West Park Leeds (website)
Wetherby (website)
Wharfedale (website)
Wheatley Hills (website)
Whitby (Whitby website)
Wibsey (website)
Withernsea (website)

Y
Yarnbury (website)
York (website)
York Railway Institute (website)

County club competitions 

The Yorkshire RFU currently runs the following competitions for club sides based in the districts that make up modern day Yorkshire - East Riding of Yorkshire, North Yorkshire, South Yorkshire and West Yorkshire:

Leagues

Yorkshire 1 - league ranked at tier 7 of the English rugby union system 
Yorkshire 2 - tier 8 league 
Yorkshire 3 - tier 9 league
Yorkshire 4 (North West) - tier 10 league
Yorkshire 4 (South East) - tier 10 league

Cups

Yorkshire Cup - founded in 1877, open to clubs at tiers 4-6 of the English rugby union system
Yorkshire Shield
Yorkshire Trophy
Yorkshire Vase

Discontinued competitions
Yorkshire 4 - tier 11 league that was restructured into Yorkshire 4 (North West) and Yorkshire 4 (South East) in 2017
Yorkshire 5 - tier 11 league that was discontinued in 2017 
Yorkshire 6 - tier 12 league that was discontinued in 2010

See also
Northern Division
English rugby union system

References

External links
Yorkshire RFU website

1869 establishments in England
Rugby union governing bodies in England
!
Sports organizations established in 1869
Rugby union